The .303 British (designated as the 303 British by the C.I.P. and SAAMI) or 7.7×56mmR, is a  calibre rimmed rifle cartridge.  The .303 inch bore diameter is measured between rifling lands as is the common practice in Europe which follows the traditional black powder convention.

It was first manufactured in Britain as a stop-gap black powder round put into service in December 1888 for the Lee–Metford rifle. From 1891 the cartridge used smokeless powder which had been the intention from the outset, but the decision on which smokeless powder to adopt had been delayed. It was the standard British and Commonwealth military cartridge for rifles and machine guns from 1889 until it was replaced by the 7.62×51mm NATO.

Cartridge specifications
The .303 British has 3.64 ml (56 grains H2O) cartridge case capacity. The pronounced tapering exterior shape of the case was designed to promote reliable case feeding and extraction in bolt-action rifles and machine guns alike, under challenging conditions.

.303 British maximum C.I.P. cartridge dimensions. All sizes in millimeters (mm).

Americans would define the shoulder angle at alpha/2 ≈ 17 degrees. The common rifling twist rate for this cartridge is  10 in), 5 grooves, Ø lands = , Ø grooves = , land width =  and the primer type is Berdan or Boxer (in large rifle size).

According to official rulings of the C.I.P. (Commission Internationale Permanente pour l'Epreuve des Armes à Feu Portatives), the .303 British can handle up to  Pmax piezo pressure. In C.I.P. regulated countries every rifle cartridge combo has to be proofed at 125% of this maximum C.I.P. pressure to certify for sale to consumers.
This means that .303 British chambered arms in C.I.P. regulated countries are currently (2014) proof tested at  PE piezo pressure.

The SAAMI (Sporting Arms and Ammunition Manufacturers' Institute) maximum average pressure (MAP) for this cartridge is  piezo pressure (45,000 CUP).

The measurement  is the nominal size of the bore measured between the lands which follows the older black powder nomenclature.

Military use

History and development
During a service life of over 70 years with the British Commonwealth armed forces the .303-inch (7.7 mm) cartridge in its ball pattern progressed through ten marks which eventually extended to a total of about 26 variations.
The bolt thrust of the .303 British is relatively low compared to many other service rounds used in the early 20th century.

Propellant
The original .303 British service cartridge employed black powder as a propellant, and was adopted for the Lee–Metford rifle, which had rifling designed to lessen fouling from this propellant, which replaced the Martini-Henry rifle in 1888. Some Martini-Henrys were rebarrelled to use the new .303 as the "Martini–Metford"

The Lee–Metford was used as a trial platform by the British Committee on Explosives to experiment with many different smokeless powders then coming to market, including Ballistite, Cordite, and Rifleite.  Ballistite was a stick-type smokeless powder composed of soluble nitrocellulose and nitroglycerine.  Cordite was a stick-type or 'chopped' smokeless gunpowder composed of nitroglycerine, gun-cotton, and mineral jelly, while Rifleite was a true nitrocellulose powder, composed of soluble and insoluble nitrocellulose, phenyl amidazobense, and volatiles similar to French smokeless powders. Unlike Cordite, Rifleite was a flake powder, and contained no nitroglycerine. Excessive wear of the shallow Metford rifling with all smokeless powders then available caused ordnance authorities to institute a new type of barrel rifling designed by the Royal Small Arms Factory at Enfield, to increase barrel life; the redesigned rifle introduced in 1895 as the Lee–Enfield. After extensive testing, the Committee on Explosives selected Cordite for use in the Mark II .303 British service cartridge.

Projectile
After tests determined that the service bullet had too thin a jacket when used with cordite, the Mk II bullet was introduced, with a flat base and thicker copper-nickel jacket.

Mark II – Mark VI

The Mk II round-nosed bullet was found to be unsatisfactory when used in combat, particularly when compared to the "dum-dum" expanding bullet rounds issued in limited numbers in 1897 during the Chitral and Tirah expeditions of 1897–98 on the North West Frontier of India. This led to the 1898 introduction of the Cartridge S.A. ball .303 inch Cordite Mark III, basically the original 215-grain (13.9 g) bullet with the jacketing cut back to expose the lead in the nose. The Mk III load, however, was almost immediately withdrawn as a result of production issues leading to the introduction of the similar Mk IV hollow-point loading in February of the next year, which was put into mass production in Britain, Canada and New Zealand. Following the pivotal Battle of Omdurman of the Mahdist War, Major Mathias of the Royal Army Medical Corps observed a young man who had been struck twice by Mark IV bullets:

The design of the Mk IV hollow-point bullet shifted bullet weight rearwards, improving stability and accuracy over the regular round-nose bullet. These soft-nosed and hollow-point bullets, while effective against human targets, had a tendency to shed the outer metal jacket upon firing; the latter occasionally stuck in the bore, causing a dangerous obstruction. This was addressed by the introduction of a revised Mk V loading later in October (controversially so, as by August the Hague Convention had already made the military implementation of such expanding bullets illegal) identical to the Mark IV round apart from the addition of 2% antimony to the lead core and an additional 1.3 mm in length.

The concern about expanding bullets was brought up at the Hague Convention of 1899 by Swiss and Dutch representatives. The Swiss were concerned about small arms ammunition that "increased suffering", and the Dutch focused on the British Mark III .303 loading in response to their treatment of Boer settlers in South Africa. The British and American defence was that they should not focus on specific bullet designs, like hollow-points, but instead on rounds that caused "superfluous injury". The parties in the end agreed to abstain from using expanding bullets. With the use of expanding bullets against signatories of the convention deemed inhumane, the Mk III, Mk IV, and Mk V were withdrawn from active service. The remaining stocks (over 45 million rounds) were used for target practice. The Mark III and other expanding versions of the .303 were not issued during the Second Boer War (1899–1902). Boer guerrillas allegedly used expanding hunting ammunition against the British during the war, and New Zealand Commonwealth troops may have brought Mark III rounds with them privately after the Hague Convention without authorization.

To replace the Mk III, IV, and V, the Mark VI round was introduced in 1904, using a round nose bullet similar to the Mk II, but with a thinner jacket designed to produce some expansion, though this proved not to be the case.

Mark VII

In 1898, Atelier de Construction de Puteaux (APX), with their "Balle D" design for the 8mm Lebel cartridge, revolutionised bullet design with the introduction of pointed "spitzer" rounds. In addition to being pointed, the bullet was also much lighter in order to deliver a higher muzzle velocity. It was found that as velocity increased the bullets suddenly became much more deadly.

In 1910, the British took the opportunity to replace their Mk VI cartridge with a more modern design. The Mark VII loading used a  pointed bullet with a flat-base. The Mk VII was different from earlier .303 bullet designs or spitzer projectiles in general. Although it appears to be a conventional spitzer-shape full metal jacket bullet, this appearance is deceptive: its designers made the front third of the interior of the Mk 7 bullets out of aluminium (from Canada) or tenite (cellulosic plastic), wood pulp or compressed paper, instead of lead and they were autoclaved to prevent wound infection. This lighter nose shifted the centre of gravity of the bullet towards the rear, making it tail heavy. Although the bullet was stable in flight due to the gyroscopic forces imposed on it by the rifling of the barrel, it behaved very differently upon hitting the target. As soon as the bullet hit the target and decelerated, its heavier lead base caused it to pitch violently and deform, thereby inflicting more severe gunshot wounds than a standard single-core spitzer design. The Mk VII bullet was considered to be in compliance of the Hague Convention as its metal jacket completely covered the cores. The convention only prohibited "the use of bullets which can easily expand or change their form inside the human body such as bullets with a hard covering which does not completely cover the core...". It was noted by German Professor Dr. K. Stargardt in December 1914 that the Mk VII bullet would routinely "...disintegrate on the lightest contact with a firm body, such as a bone," resulting in an "explosive effect," and leaving artillery-like fragmentation in the body.

The Mk VIIz (and later Mk VIIIz) rounds have versions utilizing  Dupont No. 16 single-base smokeless powder based on nitrocellulose flake shaped propellants. The nitrocellulose versions—first introduced in World War I—were designated with a "z" postfix indicated after the type (e.g. Mark VIIz, with a bullet weight of ) and in headstamps.

.276 Enfield
.303 British cartridges, along with the Lee–Enfield rifle, were heavily criticized after the Second Boer War. Their heavy round-nosed bullets had low muzzle velocities and suffered compared to the 7×57mm rounds fired from the Mauser Model 1895. The high-velocity 7×57mm had a flatter trajectory and longer range that excelled on the open country of the South African plains. In 1910, work began on a long-range replacement cartridge, which emerged in 1912 as the .276 Enfield. The British also sought to replace the Lee–Enfield rifle with the Pattern 1913 Enfield rifle, based on the Mauser M98 bolt action design. Although the round had better ballistics, troop trials in 1913 revealed problems including excessive recoil, muzzle flash, barrel wear and overheating. Attempts were made to find a cooler-burning propellant, but further trials were halted in 1914 by the onset of World War I. As a result, the Lee–Enfield rifle was retained, and the .303 British cartridge (with the improved Mark VII loading) was kept in service.

Mark VIIIz
In 1938 the Mark VIIIz "streamline ammunition" round was approved to obtain greater range from the Vickers machine gun. Mk VIIIz ammunition was described as being for "All suitably-sighted .303-inch small arms and machine guns" – rifles and Bren guns were proofed at  – but caused significant bore erosion in weapons formerly using Mk VII ammunition, ascribed to the channelling effect of the boat-tail projectile. As a result, it was prohibited from general use with rifles and light machine guns except when low flash was important and in emergencies. As a consequence of the official prohibition, ordnance personnel reported that every man who could get his hands on Mk VIIIz ammunition promptly used it in his own rifle.

Tracer, armour-piercing and incendiary
Tracer and armour-piercing cartridges were introduced during 1915, with explosive Pomeroy bullets introduced as the Mark VII.Y in 1916.

Several incendiaries were privately developed from 1914 to counter the Zeppelin threat but none were approved until the Brock design late in 1916 as BIK Mark VII.K Wing Commander Frank Brock RNVR, its inventor, was a member of the Brock fireworks-making family. Anti-zeppelin missions typically used machine guns loaded with a mixture of Brock bullets containing potassium chlorate, Pomeroy bullets containing dynamite, and Buckingham bullets containing pyrophoric yellow phosphorus. A later incendiary was known as the de Wilde, which had the advantage of leaving no visible trail when fired. The de Wilde was later used in some numbers in fighter guns during the 1940 Battle of Britain.

These rounds were extensively developed over the years and saw several Mark numbers. The last tracer round introduced into British service was the G Mark 8 in 1945, the last armour-piercing round was the W Mark 1Z in 1945 and the last incendiary round was the B Mark 7 in 1942. Explosive bullets were not produced in the UK after 1933 due to the relatively small amount of explosive that could be contained in the bullet, limiting their effectiveness, their role being taken by the use of Mark 6 and 7 incendiary bullets.

In 1935 the .303 O Mark 1 Observing round was introduced for use in machine guns. The bullet to this round was designed to break up with a puff of smoke on impact. The later Mark 6 and 7 incendiary rounds could also be used in this role.

During World War I British factories alone produced 7,000,000,000 rounds of .303 ammunition. Factories in other countries added greatly to this total.

Military surplus ammunition

Military surplus .303 British ammunition that may be available often has corrosive primers, given the mass manufacture of the cartridge predates Commonwealth adoption of non-corrosive primers concurrent with the adoption of 7.62 NATO in 1954. There is no problem with using ammunition loaded with corrosive primers, provided that the gun is thoroughly cleaned with hot flowing water after use to remove the corrosive salts. The safe method for all shooters of military surplus ammunition is to assume the cartridge is corrosively primed unless certain otherwise.

Care must be taken to identify the round properly before purchase or loading into weapons. Cartridges with the Roman numeral VIII on the headstamp are the Mark 8 round, specifically designed for use in Vickers machine guns. The best general-purpose ammunition for any .303 military rifle is the Mark 7 design because it provides the best combination of accuracy and stopping power.

Headstamps and colour-coding

Japanese 7.7 mm ammunition

Imperial Japanese Navy Air Service adopted Ro-Go Ko-gata seaplane armed with a .303 MG in 1918, and the calibre was common on surplus Entente aircraft acquired by the Imperial Japanese Army Air Service after WWI, so its usage continued during the Interbellum, and on naval aircraft even throughout WWII. Japan produced a number of machine guns that were direct copies of the British Lewis (Japanese Type 92 machine gun) and Vickers machine guns as well as ammunition for them. The 7.7 mm cartridge used by the Japanese versions of the British guns is a direct copy of the .303 British (7.7×56mmR) rimmed cartridge and is distinctly different from the 7.7×58mm Arisaka rimless and 7.7×58mm Type 92 semi-rimmed cartridges used in other Japanese machine guns and rifles.
 Ball: . Cupro-nickel jacket with a composite aluminium/lead core. Black primer.
 Armour-piercing.: Brass jacket with a steel core. White primer.
 Tracer: . Cupro-nickel jacket with a lead core. Red primer.
 Incendiary: . Brass jacket with white phosphorus and lead core. Green primer.
 H.E.: Copper jacket with a PETN and lead core. Purple primer.

Note: standard Japanese ball ammunition was very similar to the British Mk 7 cartridge. The two had identical bullet weights and a "tail-heavy" design, as can be seen in the cut-away diagram.

Civilian use
The .303 cartridge has seen much sporting use with surplus military rifles, especially in Australia, Canada, New Zealand, and to a lesser extent in the United States and South Africa. In Canada, it was found to be adequate for any game. In Australia, it was common for military rifles to be re-barrelled in .303/25 and .303/22. However the .303 round still retains a considerable following as a game cartridge for all game species, especially Sambar deer in wooded country.  A change.org petition asking Lithgow Arms to chamber the LA102 centrefire rifle in .303 as a special edition release has attracted considerable attention both in Australia and worldwide.  In South Africa, .303 Lee–Enfield rifles captured by the Boers during the Boer War were adapted for sporting purposes and became popular with many hunters of non-dangerous game, being regarded as adequate for anything from the relatively small impala to the massive eland and kudu.

Commercial ammunition and reloading

The .303 British is one of the few (along with the .22 Hornet, .30-30 Winchester, and 7.62×54mmR) bottlenecked rimmed centrefire rifle cartridges still in common use today. Most of the bottleneck rimmed cartridges of the late 1880s and 1890s fell into disuse by the end of the First World War.

Commercial ammunition for weapons chambered in .303 British is readily available, as the cartridge is still manufactured by major producers such as Remington, Federal, Winchester, Sellier & Bellot, Denel-PMP, Prvi Partizan and Wolf. Commercially produced ammunition is widely available in various full metal jacket bullet, soft point, hollow point, flat-based and boat tail designs, both spitzer and round-nosed.

Reloading equipment and ammunition components are also manufactured by several companies. Dies and other tools for the reloading of .303 British are produced by Forster, Hornady, Lee, Lyman, RCBS and Redding. Bullets specifically produced and sold for reloading .303 British are made by Sierra, Hornady, Speer, Woodleigh, Barnes and Remington. Where extreme accuracy is required, the Sierra Matchking  HPBT bullet is a popular choice. Sierra does not advocate the use of Matchking-brand bullets for hunting applications. For hunting applications, Sierra produces the ProHunter in  diameter. The increasingly popular all-copper Barnes TSX is now available in the  diameter as a  projectile which is recommended by Barnes for hunting applications.

With most rifles chambered in .303 British being of military origin, success in reloading the calibre depends on the reloader's ability to compensate for the often loose chamber of the rifle. Reduced charge loads and neck sizing are two unanimous recommendations from experienced loaders of .303 British to newcomers to the calibre. The classic  FMJ bullets are widely available, though purchasers may wish to check whether or not these feature the tail-heavy Mk 7 design. In any case other bullet weights are available, e.g. , both for hunting and target purposes.

Hunting use
The .303 British cartridge is suitable for all medium-sized game and is an excellent choice for whitetail deer and black bear hunting. In Canada it was a popular moose and deer cartridge when military surplus rifles were available and cheap; it is still used. The .303 British can offer very good penetrating ability due to a fast twist rate that enables it to fire long, heavy bullets with a high sectional density. Canadian Rangers use it for survival and polar bear protection. In 2015, the Canadian Rangers began the process to evaluate rifles chambered for .308 Winchester. The Canadian Department of National Defence has since replaced the previously issued Lee–Enfield No. 4 rifles with the Colt Canada C19 chambered as evaluated in 7.62×51mm NATO/.308 Winchester.

Rounds developed from .303

Pre-WWI sporting rounds
During the 1890s, Scottish gunsmith Daniel Fraser developed a rimless version of the cartridge known as ".303 Fraser Velox" or ".303 Fraser Rimless", loaded with a bullet of his own oblique ratchet design to enhance expansion which was patented in 1897 The bullet was also used in a proprietary loading of .303 British marketed as ".303 Fraser Flanged".

Proprietary loadings of .303 British include the ".303 Marksman" by Eley Brothers from before 1908. and ".303 Swift" from before 1911.

In 1899, the British service round was lengthened and necked-out to create the .375 Flanged Nitro Express hunting cartridge for single-shot and double rifles. Around 1905, it was necked down back to create .375/303 Westley Richards Accelerated Express.

Post-1917 military experiments
In 1917, design work started on a more powerful military cartridge of the same calibre and overall length. In 1918 it was planned that the new round, also retaining the old rim diameter, would be used in rechambered P14 rifles with AP rounds to defeat German targets on the battlefield of WWI as well as in the RAF in modified Lewis gun. The cartridge was "produced in quantity" but not adopted formally. The case was 62mm long with the bullet (a Ball Mark VII or Mark VIIW) set deep within to keep overall length down. The ordinary round was designated "Cartridge S.A. ball .303 inch Rimless" despite the fact that it retained headspacing on its rim and was  semi-rimmed.  It's better known today under names like ".303 Lewis Semi-Rimmed".

Post-1945 Australian wildcats
After WWII, Australians founds themselves with quite a few .303" service rifles but at the same time new legal restrictions on military ammunition, which led to development of many wildcat rounds, the best-known of which are .303/25 and .303/22.

Post-1945 South African developments
In parallel to Australia, the same wildcatting was happening in other countries of the Commonwealth, and in 1969 Pretoria Metal Pressings started factory production of a .303 necked down to 6 mm (.243") under the name of 6 mm Musgrave.

.303 Epps
Canadian Ellwood Epps, founder of Epps Sporting Goods, created an improved version of the .303 British. It has better ballistic performance than the standard .303 British cartridge. These changes increase the case's internal volume by approximately 9%. The increased shoulder angle and reduced case taper eliminate the drooping shoulders of the original .303 British case, which, combined with reaming the chamber to .303 Epps, improves case life.
The .303 British case was also used as a parent case for the South African designed 6mm Musgrave cartridge that was billed as a cheap surplus alternative to the popular .243 (6.2 mm) Winchester.

Firearms chambered in .303 British

 1885 Courteney Stalking Rifle
 Bren light machine gun
 Browning Model 1919 machine gun aircraft version
 BSA Autorifle
 Canadian Ross Rifle Mk I through III
 Caldwell machine gun
 Charlton Automatic Rifle
 Darne machine gun
 Farquharson rifle
 Hotchkiss .303 Mk I & I*
 Huot automatic rifle
 Jungle Carbine
 Lee–Enfield rifle
 Lee–Metford rifle
 Lewis gun
 McCrudden light machine rifle
 Martini–Enfield rifle
 P14 rifle
 Parker Hale Sporter Rifle
 Ruger No. 1
 Thorneycroft carbine
 Vickers-Berthier light machine gun
 Vickers machine gun
 Vickers K machine gun
 Winchester Model 1895

See also
 7 mm caliber (overview of cartridges)
 British military rifles
 List of rifle cartridges
 Table of handgun and rifle cartridges
 .303 Magnum
 .303 Savage

Notes

References

External links

 
 
 
 
 
 
 7,7 x 56 R Tipo 89 Giapponese
 C.I.P. TDCC datasheet .303 British
 SAAMI Drawing 303 British

.303 British firearms
British firearm cartridges
Military cartridges
Pistol and rifle cartridges
Rimmed cartridges
Weapons and ammunition introduced in 1889